Wasudev Waman Patankar (Marathi: वासुदेव वामन पाटणकर; 29 December 1908 – 20 June 1997), popularly known by the name Bhausaheb Patankar (Marathi: भाऊसाहेब पाटणकर), was a prominent Marathi shayar, and one of the first to pen Marathi shayari, until then Shayari was an outcome of Urdu language.
W.W Patankar was an Advocate by profession.

Life 
Bhausaheb was born as Wasudev Waman Patankar on 29 December 1908. Wasudev's  father Waman Patankar was a school headmaster at Achalpur.(Maharashtra). Patankar studied Vedas, philosophy and other shastras as a shishya under Sitaramshastri Kurumbhatte. In later years he completed his graduation in arts and further in law and worked as a full-time advocate at Yavatmal District court from 1933 to 1959,because of his profession he used to deal with lot of villagers as clients and was tempted to jungle life,  he took hunting lessons from his guru Baburao Naidu. He had a licensed Winchester Model 1895 (hunting cartridge .405 Winchester) rifle and had an official games license, which he used for hunting tigers, the speciality of his hunting was that never hunted the tiger sitting on a hunting platform or a tree stand as he believed in doing it face to face his observing nature can be seen from the observations he had on nature and its happenings, he wrote a series of such observations in Amrut magazine from 1952 to 1956.
He retired due to eyesight problems.

Writing style 
After getting into Urdu shayari he wanted to pen its independent Marathi version He started with Marathi shayari at the age of 52 and his writing style clearly depicts his young heartedness and happy go lucky nature. With lucid and subtle use of words in his shayari large number of people relished it from beginning. His Marathi shayari in the initial stage was tending to humour and romance but as he studied deep his shayari touched all the subjects from romance to various aspects of life and philosophy. Later Many Marathi shayars were inspired to present programmes of Marathi shayari.

Awards 
Rangat Sangat Pratishthan Puruskar (24 September 1995)
Shree Sant Namdev puraskar by Swatantra Sainik B.P Bhai Futane Pratishthan Jamkhed (1988)

Late Bhausaheb Patankar Memorial Award given by Rangat Sangat Pratishthan is awarded in recognition to the contribution in the field of shayari.

Books 
 Marathi Shayari (1962)
 Marathi Mushayra (1966)
 Mehfil (1975)
 Dost ho (1977)
 Zinda Dil (1980)

Further reading 
Duniya Tula Visrel A Book By Vasant Purushottam Kale on W.W Patankar

References 

1908 births
1997 deaths
Marathi-language poets
Marathi-language writers
People from Yavatmal
Poets from Maharashtra
20th-century Indian poets
Rashtrasant Tukadoji Maharaj Nagpur University alumni
Indian male poets
20th-century Indian male writers